The 2009 UEFA Women's Championship, or just Women's Euro 2009, was played in Finland between 23 August and 10 September 2009. The host was appointed on 11 July 2006, in a UEFA Executive Committee meeting in Berlin and the Finnish proposal won over the Dutch proposal.

The UEFA Women's Championship is a regular tournament involving European national teams from countries affiliated to UEFA, the European governing body, who have qualified for the competition. The competition aims to determine which national women's team is the best in Europe.

The 2009 tournament was won by Germany for a seventh time in ten events. They beat England, appearing in their first final since 1984, 6–2 in the final. The Germans also boasted the tournament's leading goalscorer in Inka Grings.

Format
Twelve teams competed in the competition, an increase of 4 teams from 8 teams that played in previous tournaments. After a preliminary round, 30 teams competed in a qualifying group stage. Those teams were divided into six groups of five, with teams playing each other on a home-and-away basis. The six group winners advanced to the final tournament. The six runners-up and the four best third-placed teams played a qualification playoff. Those 11 teams and the hosts completed the 12-team lineup for the competition.

Qualification

45 teams competed for the eleven available places in the final tournament; the qualifying teams together with the host were:

1 Bold indicates champion for that year. Italic indicates host for that year

Venues 
The tournament was played in four cities in Finland: Helsinki, Turku, Tampere and Lahti.

Tournament review

Matchday One – 23–25 August 

In the opening round of Group A matches, Finland and the Netherlands showed that they would be contenders for qualification beyond the group stage. In the opening match of the tournament goals from Kirsten van de Ven and Karin Stevens would give the Dutch women a 2–0 victory over Ukraine. The evening fixture in the Olympic Stadium in Helsinki saw the host nation Finland begin their campaign with a 1–0 victory over Denmark. Maija Saari scored the first goal of the campaign, her first international goal.

In Group B defending World and European Champions Germany set the marker, dispatching fellow contenders Norway 4–0. The champions and favourites to defend their title stuttered early on as they took a 1–0 lead, but in stoppage time three more goals helped the Germans to their victory and their lead in Group B. In the other match in Group B, France began their campaign with a win, recovering from a goal down to beat Iceland 3–1.

Group C opened with a surprise, World Cup quarter-finalists England beaten 2–1 by Group C outsiders Italy. England led 1–0 thanks to a Williams penalty just before half-time; however, goals from Panico and Tuttino gave Italy the victory. England finished the game with ten women after Casey Stoney was dismissed. In Group C's other match 2003 World Cup finalists Sweden opened their challenge with a comfortable 3–0 win over Russia.

Matchday Two – 26–28 August 
Finland continued their good form in Group A, following up their 1–0 victory with a 2–1 win against the Netherlands. Kalmari scored twice as the home nation moved into the quarter-finals as winners of Group A with a match to spare. The win for Finland would prove to be the end for Ukraine. Earlier on the Ukrainian team had been beaten by Denmark 2–1, and a result of the Dutch and Danes' meeting in the next round of Group games could no longer qualify for the quarter-finals. Maiken Pape scored three minutes from time to devastate the debut nation.

Group B saw holders Germany progress after another victory, this time a 5–1 success against the French. Norway recovered from their opening defeat to edge past Iceland by a single goal, a result which eliminated the Icelandic team.

In Group C; Sweden booked their place in the last eight with a 2–0 win over Italy arguably the surprise package of the tournament so far. Two goals in the first twenty minutes killed the game for Sweden who now meet England in their final group match. Sweden's win in Turku meant that if England lost their match against Russia then their hopes would be over at the Group stage for the third successive Euro. Russia knowing a win would kickstart their campaign appeared certain to condemn the English to an exit as goals from Ksenia Tsybutovich and Olesya Kurochkina gave the Russians a 2–0 lead. However, that wasn't the end of the tale. England player Karen Carney reduced the gap and then just ten minutes later Carney dinked the ball through to Aluko who equalised for the England team. Two minutes before half-time Kelly Smith scored the fifth goal of the half and what proved to be the winner in a result which gives both sides a chance of qualifying.

Matchday Three – 29–31 August
With both Ukraine and Finland knowing where they would finish in the Group, the hosts made four changes to their line up for the final group game. The Ukrainian side took advantage of the changes and signed off from their first UEFA Women's Euro with a 1–0 victory. With everything to play for in the other Group A match, The Netherlands with goals from Sylvia Smit and Manon Melis took a 2–0 lead over Denmark. Rasmussen reduced the arrears however the Dutch would hold on to take second place and leave Denmark relying on results from Group B and Group C to now progress to the quarter-finals.

In Group B; Germany through Inka Grings took top spot and the maximum nine points from three matches as they ended the Icelandic challenge with a 1–0 victory. Iceland, making their debut in the tournament showed renewed spirit but could not secure their first point in the European Championships. In the other game a 1–1 draw between Norway and France secured both teams their place in the quarter-finals.

The first round concluded on 31 August with the final games in Group C. Played simultaneously as are all final group matches. Italy secured their passage in the tournament with a 2–0 win over Russia, eliminating the Russians from the competition. Russia aware that a three-goal win would guarantee a place in the knock-out stages held out until 13 minutes from the end. In Group C's final game Sweden secured top spot in the group with a 1–1 draw against England, a result which saw the English side qualify. The result also eliminated Denmark in Group A as the side in third place with the worst record.

Quarter-finals – 3–4 September

In the opening quarter-final in Turku, Group A winner Finland took on second-best third-place and Group C qualifiers England. England, seeking to reach the last four following their early elimination in 2005 started well; Aluko giving them a 1–0 half-time lead. A Williams goal put England 2–0 up on 49 minutes and in total control. The home team rallied a goal from Sjölund recovering the deficit to 2–1 before Aluko put England 3–1 up and with one foot in the last four a minute later. A Sällström goal proved mere consolation for the Home nation who went out of the tournament 3–2.

In the second quarter-final held between the runners-up of Group A and Group B France took on Netherlands. In a tight match no goals would be scored in normal time or extra time forcing the first shootout of the tournament. After eight perfect penalties making the score 4–4, both teams missed their next two efforts as the tension continued to mount. However, the Dutch would prevail 5–4 to send out France, and book a date with England in the semi-finals.

In Friday's quarter-final matches, Germany took a 2–0 lead thanks to Two goals from Grings, making her top goalscorer in the tournament so far. Patriza Panico scored for Italy, and for a couple of moments it seemed that the holders may be in trouble. However, Germany soon regained control in possession and would win 2–1 to book their place in the semi-finals yet again.

In the final match of the round, Norway began to impress. Two goals in 7 minutes meant that the Norwegian women led 2–0 at half-time against a very strong and very impressive Swedish side. Cecile Pedersen's goal on the hour meant Norway led one of the favourites in Sweden 3–0. Even though Sandell Svensson scored for Sweden it would prove to be no more than consolation as Norway won 3–1 to secure a semi-final spot with Germany and a chance to avenge the 4–0 loss suffered against the Germans in their opening game.

Semi-finals – 6–7 September 

In the opening semi-final England faced the Netherlands; Both teams having caused surprises to reach this stage of the tournament. England took the lead in the 61st minute with a goal from Kelly Smith. Marlous Pieëte levelled the scores at 1–1. The score at the end of 90 minutes was indeed that and extra-time started with the Dutch, who had advanced already via that method as favourite. However, with four minutes left and with Penalties looming Jill Scott scored the winner to send England into the final.

Final (England vs. Germany) – 10 September 

England tried from the start to take the game to the favourites, Germany. But after missing several chances, England found themselves behind after 20 minutes of play when Germany scored in their very first attack (Birgit Prinz), and immediately scored a second—a long-range shot from Melanie Behringer to go 2–0 up. Two minutes later, England pulled one back (Karen Carney) and the game remained delicately balanced until half-time. The second half initially continued much the same as the first, with England generally attacking and Germany content to play a counter-attacking game. In the second half, Germany added a third (Kim Kulig) and England responded with their second (Kelly Smith), but when Grings scored Germany's fourth, England seemed to lose heart, and Germany were able to seal the win with a further two goals (Grings and Prinz getting their second goal each).

Gallery

Results

All times local (EEST/UTC+3)

Group stage
The top two teams from each group progress to the quarter-finals along with the two best third-placed teams.

If two or more teams are level on points they are split by, in order of precedence: (a) higher number of points obtained in the matches played between the teams in question, (b) superior goal difference from the matches played between the teams in question (c) higher number of goals scored in the matches between the teams in question, (d) superior goal difference from all matches played, (e) higher number of goals scored, (f) Fair Play ranking (from during the tournament), (g) the drawing of lots.

Group A

Group B

Group C

Third-placed qualifiers
At the end of the first stage, a comparison will be made between the third placed teams of each group. The two best third-placed teams advance to the quarter-finals.

Knockout stage

Quarter-finals

Semi-finals

Final

Goalscorers

6 goals
  Inka Grings

3 goals

  Eniola Aluko
  Kelly Smith
  Fatmire Bajramaj
  Victoria Sandell Svensson

2 goals

  Karen Carney
  Fara Williams
  Laura Österberg Kalmari
  Camille Abily
  Melanie Behringer
  Linda Bresonik
  Simone Laudehr
  Birgit Prinz
  Patrizia Panico
  Kirsten van de Ven
  Cecilie Pedersen

1 goal

  Camilla Sand Andersen
  Maiken Pape
  Johanna Rasmussen
  Jill Scott
  Faye White
  Maija Saari
  Linda Sällström
  Annica Sjölund
  Sonia Bompastor
  Louisa Nécib
  Gaëtane Thiney
  Annike Krahn
  Kim Kulig
  Anja Mittag
  Célia Okoyino da Mbabi
  Hólmfríður Magnúsdóttir
  Melania Gabbiadini
  Alessia Tuttino
  Tatiana Zorri
  Manon Melis
  Marlous Pieëte
  Sylvia Smit
  Karin Stevens
  Anneli Giske
  Isabell Herlovsen
  Lene Storløkken
  Olesya Kurochkina
  Ksenia Tsybutovich
  Kosovare Asllani
  Charlotte Rohlin
  Lotta Schelin
  Caroline Seger
  Daryna Apanaschenko
  Lyudmyla Pekur

own goals
  Stina Segerström (playing against Norway)

Squads

See also
UEFA Women's Championship
UEFA
Women's association football

References

External links

Women's Euro 2009 – UEFA Official Page
Official technical report
Dedicated Finnish Site for Euro 2009 (Finland F.A)

 
2009
2009
Women
UEFA
2009 in Finnish women's football
August 2009 sports events in Europe
September 2009 sports events in Europe
2009 in Finnish women's sport
Sports competitions in Lahti
International sports competitions in Turku
International sports competitions in Helsinki
2000s in Turku
2000s in Helsinki
Sports competitions in Tampere